John Fullington (born May 30, 1991) is an American football guard who is currently a free agent. He originally signed with the Green Bay Packers as undrafted free agent in 2014.

College career
Fullington started all 13 games for Washington State as a senior in 2013, opening the first five games at right guard and the final eight at right tackle. He won the Mike Utley Award in 2013 for WSU's offensive lineman of the year. Fullington started the final 43 games of his career, which is tied for the longest streak by an offensive lineman in program history and tied for the second longest by any Cougar.

Professional career

Green Bay Packers
Fullington signed with the Green Bay Packers as a rookie free agent on May 13, 2014. He was released on August 30, 2014, for final roster cuts.

San Francisco 49ers
The San Francisco 49ers signed Fullington to their practice squad on September 1, 2014. He was waived on October 7, 2014.

Arizona Cardinals
Fullington signed to the Arizona Cardinals' practice squad on December 8, 2014.

He signed a futures contract with the Cardinals on January 5, 2015. He was released on May 5, 2016.

New Orleans Saints
On July 29, 2016, Fullington signed with the New Orleans Saints. On September 3, 2016, he was waived by the Saints and was re-signed to the practice squad. He signed a reserve/future contract with the Saints on January 2, 2017.

On September 2, 2017, Fullington was waived by the Saints and was signed to the practice squad the next day. He was promoted to the active roster on December 29, 2017.

On August 5, 2018, Fullington was waived/injured by the Saints and placed on injured reserve. He was released on August 10, 2018.

Where is he now?
As of 2018 through 2022, he is a physical education teacher and the Head Football Coach at Hawkins Middle School (North Mason School District, Belfair, Washington). "I've always wanted to be a gym teacher" states John Fullington.

References

External links
Washington State Cougars bio
Arizona Cardinals bio
NMHS substitute teacher career

1991 births
Living people
People from Bremerton, Washington
Players of American football from Washington (state)
American football offensive linemen
Washington State Cougars football players
Green Bay Packers players
San Francisco 49ers players
Arizona Cardinals players
New Orleans Saints players